Drop Dead Divas fifth season premiered on June 23, 2013 and concluded on November 3, 2013, on Lifetime. Season five aired on Sundays at 9:00 pm ET (6:00 pm PT) and consisted of 13 episodes.

Cast

Main cast
 Brooke Elliott as Jane Bingum (13 episodes)
 Margaret Cho as Teri Lee (13 episodes)
 Jackson Hurst as Grayson Kent (13 episodes)
 Kate Levering as Kim Kaswell (8 episodes)
 April Bowlby as Stacy Barrett (13 episodes)
 Lex Medlin as Judge Owen French (13 episodes)
 Justin Deeley as Paul (8 episodes)

Recurring cast
 Annie Ilonzeh as Nicole (7 episodes)
 Marcus Lyle Brown as A.D.A. Paul Saginaw (4 episodes)
 Gregory Alan Williams as Judge Warren Libby (4 episodes)
 Natalie Hall as Brittney (inhabited by the real Jane Bingum) (3 episodes)

Guest cast
 Carter MacIntyre as Luke Daniels (1 episode)
 Faith Prince as Elaine Bingum (1 episode)
 Sharon Lawrence as Bobbie Dobkins (1 episode)
 Jeff Rose as Doug Resnick (1 episode)
 Rhoda Griffis as Paula Dewey (1 episode)

Production
A month and a half after Lifetime cancelled the Comedy-drama series, the cable network inked a deal with producer Sony Pictures Television to bring the show back for a fifth season. The news came as a reversal after Lifetime cancelled the hour-long drama in January, as talks with Sony Pictures Television for cost-cutting options to continue the series stalled. The decision to bring back the series suggests that the two sides reached a new, more cost-effective agreement. Justin Deeley joined the cast this season as Paul, Jane's new guardian angel. Investor Barbara Corcoran from ABC's Shark Tank series guest stars as herself in an episode where Stacy seeks advice on how to make her bakery profitable. Episode eight served as the summer finale on August 11, with the remainder of the season returning on October 6.

Episodes

References

External links
 Drop Dead Diva on Lifetime
 

2013 American television seasons